The New Haven EP-2 was a class of boxcab electric locomotives built by Baldwin-Westinghouse for the New York, New Haven and Hartford Railroad. The locomotives worked passenger trains on the New Haven's electrified division west of New Haven, Connecticut. Baldwin-Westinghouse delivered 27 locomotives between 1919–1927. The locomotives were an enlarged version of the EP-1 and EF-1 designs. They remained in service until the arrival of the dual-mode EMD FL9 locomotives in 1958.

Design 

The New Haven's electrified district extended west from New Haven, Connecticut, to The Bronx, the northernmost borough of New York City. It electrified its lines using 11 kV overhead AC. From Woodlawn to Grand Central Terminal trains ran over the New York Central Railroad's 660 V third rail DC. At Port Morris trains continued over the New York Connecting Railroad to Harold Interlocking in Queens, just short of Pennsylvania Station. This route was jointly electrified by the New Haven and the Pennsylvania Railroad at 11 kV overhead AC.

To support the multiple electric systems and collection methods between New Haven and New York the EP-2 carried both pantographs and a contact shoe for third rail operation. Six twin Westinghouse 409-C2 AC traction motors drove the locomotive on six axles using a quill drive. Two more unpowered axles were located on each truck, for an unusual 1-C-1+1-C-1 wheel arrangement.

History 
The New Haven needed additional locomotives to handle services into New York City's Pennsylvania Station following the opening of the Hell Gate Bridge Route. After several unsuccessful experimental General Electric locomotives, the New Haven returned to Baldwin-Westinghouse for an improved version of the pioneering EP-1. The first five EP-2 locomotives entered service in 1919. The New Haven ordered twenty-two more between 1923–1927, for a total fleet of twenty-seven locomotives.

The New Haven supplemented the EP-1s and EP-2s with ten EP-3 boxcabs in 1931. The Pennsylvania Railroad replaced the original 600 V third rail DC with 11 kV overhead AC in 1933, allowing New Haven's electric locomotives to operate into Pennsylvania Station and eliminating the engine change in Queens. Retirement of the EP-1s began in 1936. Six EP-4 locomotives joined the roster in 1938.

Even as the New Haven added ten EP-5 locomotives in 1955, change was coming. To that end the company ordered thirty dual-mode EMD FL9 locomotives. These locomotives, capable of either diesel-electric operation or electric operation from third-rail, eliminated the need for an engine change at New Haven. Their arrival in 1958 enabled the retirement of the EP-2 fleet.

All were scrapped.

Notes

References 

 
 
 
 
 
 

1-C-1+1-C-1 locomotives
11 kV AC locomotives
600 V DC locomotives
Electric locomotives of the United States
EP-2
Standard gauge locomotives of the United States
Westinghouse locomotives
Multi-system locomotives
Railway locomotives introduced in 1919
Scrapped locomotives
Passenger locomotives